Artyom Bichayev (born 4 April 1990, Roslavl, Roslavlsky District) is a Russian political figure and deputy of the 8th State Duma convocation.

While studying at the Saratov State Academy of Law, he started to be actively involved in the work of the Young Guard of United Russia. Later he was appointed deputy regional director of the organization. From 2013 to 2019, he was the head of the All-Russia People's Front's department on the work with regions.

Since 2021 he has served as deputy of the 8th State Duma.

On 24 March 2022, the United States Treasury sanctioned him in response to the 2022 Russian invasion of Ukraine.

References

1990 births
Living people
United Russia politicians
21st-century Russian politicians
Eighth convocation members of the State Duma (Russian Federation)
Russian individuals subject to the U.S. Department of the Treasury sanctions